Kanjan is a 1947 Indian Tamil-language film directed by Covai A. Aiyamuthu and T. R. Gopu. The film stars S. V. Subbaiah, R. Malathi and T. G. Kamala Devi. No print of the film is known to survive, making it a lost film.

Plot 
The film centers on a wealthy old man and his attempt to court his son's girlfriend and make her his second wife. The film highlights social evils such as black-marketing, selling of young girls et al.

Cast 

Female cast
M. S. S. Bhagyam as Chellam
R. Malathi as Maragatham
T. G. Kamala Devi as Amaravathi
C. K. Saraswathi as Anjuham
K. S. Angamuthu as Kuppayi

Male cast
S. V. Subbaiah as Kanjan
M. N. Nambiar as Velappan
P. V. Narasimha Bharathi as Kumarasami
M. K. Mustafa as Loganathan
Nat Annaji Rao as Murugesan
B. Rajagopala Iyer as Subodar

Production 
The film was produced by K. Velliangiri, a partner of Jupiter pictures when writer Covai A. Aiyamuthu wanted to make a film. Covai A. Aiyamuthu directed the film assisted by the company's editor T. R. Gopu who also did the editing. Covai A. Aiyamuthu wrote the story and dialogues too. Cinematography was handled by P. Ramasami and art direction was by P. B. Chowdri and Kuttiyappu. C. Thangaraj was in charge of choreography. The film was made at Coimbatore Central Studios.

Reception 
The film was a flop. An interesting event took place to show the enormity of its failure. At about this film was screened in Coimbatore, a college celebrated its annual day. There was a play staged by the students. A scene showed a sinner at judgement in Yama's court. Yama says the sinner should be fried in boiling oil as punishment for his sins. Yama's accountant Chitragupta says the punishment is not enough. So Yama says, the sinner's body should be cut into pieces and fed to vultures. Again Chitragupta says the punishment is not enough. Yama thinks and comes out with a novel punishment. He says the sinner should be made to see all 3 shows of Kanjan at a stretch in the local movie theatre. The joke does not end there. The sinner wails and appeals to Yama that he be better fried in boiling oil and his body be fed to vultures rather than he be made to watch the film.

The producers K. Velliangiri and C. Sundaram who were also invitees laughed at the joke. Film historian Randor Guy wrote in 2010 that the film is "Remembered for its fine music and some of its cast who became major stars later.

Soundtrack 
Music was composed by S. M. Subbaiah Naidu while the lyrics were penned by Covai A. Aiyamuthu. A song Mandaril ezhil udayon engal Tamizhan (Tamils are the most elegant among mankind). It is said that the producers waited for 6 months after completing the shooting to record this song by Mariyappa.

References

External links 

Indian drama films
Indian black-and-white films
Films about social issues in India
Films scored by S. M. Subbaiah Naidu
Lost Indian films
1947 drama films
1947 films
1940s lost films
Lost drama films
Jupiter Pictures films